The Dallas Cowboys are a professional American football team based in Frisco, Texas. Their stadium is located in Arlington, Texas.  They are members of the Eastern Division of the National Football Conference (NFC) in the National Football League (NFL). The Cowboys franchise was founded in 1960 as an expansion team. The team played their games in the Cotton Bowl from 1960 to 1970, then in Texas Stadium from 1971 to 2008, and AT&T Stadium from 2009 to present.

There have been nine head coaches for the Dallas Cowboys. Three coaches have won Super Bowls with the team: Tom Landry in Super Bowl VI and XII, Jimmy Johnson in Super Bowl XXVII and XXVIII, and Barry Switzer in Super Bowl XXX.  Landry is the team's all-time leader in games coached and wins, and Switzer leads all coaches in winning percentage with .625. Dave Campo is the only Cowboys coach with a losing record (.313), and is also the only coach in franchise history to have never posted a winning season. The team's first coach, Tom Landry, has been inducted into the Pro Football Hall of Fame.  The most recent coach (before the current) was Jason Garrett who replaced Wade Phillips on November 8, 2010. The current coach is Mike McCarthy, who replaced Jason Garrett on January 6, 2020.
Bill Parcells 2003-2006

Key

Coaches
Note: Statistics are accurate through end of the 2022 NFL season.

Notes

References

External links
 Dallas Cowboys official website
 Voices of Oklahoma interview with Barry Switzer. First person interview conducted on August 17, 2009 with Barry Switzer, Dallas Cowboy's head coach from 1994 to 1997. Original audio and transcript archived with Voices of Oklahoma oral history project.

 
Dallas Cowboys
Head coaches